Frédéric Lemoine (born 13 March 1970) is a French gymnast. He competed at the 1996 Summer Olympics.

References

External links
 

1970 births
Living people
French male artistic gymnasts
Olympic gymnasts of France
Gymnasts at the 1996 Summer Olympics
People from Pantin